The Luckiest Girl in the World is a 1936 American comedy film directed Edward Buzzell and written by Herbert Fields and Henry Myers. The film stars Jane Wyatt, Louis Hayward, Nat Pendleton, Eugene Pallette, Catherine Doucet and Phillip Reed. The film was released on October 1, 1936, by Universal Pictures.

Synopsis
When the daughter of a millionaire wants to marry a poor man, her father challenges her to live on $150 a month to prove that she can survive.

Cast
Jane Wyatt as Pat Duncan
Louis Hayward as Anthony McClellan
Nat Pendleton as Dugan
Eugene Pallette as Campbell Duncan
Catherine Doucet as Mrs. Rosalie Duncan
Phillip Reed as Percy Mayhew
Viola Callahan as Mrs. Olson
Dorothea Kent as Mary
 Edward Earle as Headwaiter
 Corbet Morris as Waiter
 Billy Wayne as 	Waiter
 Crauford Kent as Judge
 Mitchell Ingraham as Judge
 Milton Holmes asTennis Player
 Leonard Carey as Butler
 Larry McGrath as 	Referee
 Al Lang as Referee
 Frances Gregg as 	Chambermaid
 Mary Russell as Manicurist
 Herbert Corthell as 	Bartender
 Henry Sylvester as 	Porter
 Dink Freeman as Bellboy
 Franklin Pangborn as Cashier
 Maude Turner Gordon as 	Elderly Woman
 James Flavin as 	Policeman
 Eddy Chandler as Policeman
 Harry Hayden as Manager
 Richard Powell as 	Announcer
 Pat Flaherty as Finnigan
 Samuel Adams as 	Doorman 
 Walter Soderling as Store Proprietor
 Hooper Atchley as 	Conductor
 Harry Bowen as Taxicab Triver
 Harry Semels as Bum
 George Bean as Old Man
 Johnnie Morris as 	Spectator
 Elliott Rothe as Door Attendant
 George Du Count as Doorman at Cafe

References

External links
 

1936 films
1930s English-language films
American black-and-white films
1936 comedy films
American comedy films
Universal Pictures films
Films directed by Edward Buzzell
1930s American films